Altogether may refer to:

 Altogether (The Nolans album)
 Altogether (TV series), a 1975 Canadian television series
 Altogether (Turnover album)

See also
 The Altogether, a 2001 album by Orbital